In Greek mythology, Molus (/ˈmoʊləs/; Ancient Greek: Μῶλος Molos means 'toil and moil') was a member of the Aetolian royal family.

Family 
Molus was the son of Ares and princess Demonice, daughter of King Agenor of Pleuron. He had three brothers namely: Evenus, Pylus and Thestius. Molus was the father of Moline who mothered the Molionides by Actor of Elis.

Mythology 
Molus only appeared in Apollodorus, Bibliotheca where the scholar discussed the descendants of Aeolus, son of Hellen:And Agenor, son of Pleuron, married Epicaste, daughter of Calydon, and begat Porthaon and Demonice, who had Evenus, Molus, Pylus, and Thestius by Ares.

Notes

References 

 Apollodorus, The Library with an English Translation by Sir James George Frazer, F.B.A., F.R.S. in 2 Volumes, Cambridge, MA, Harvard University Press; London, William Heinemann Ltd. 1921. ISBN 0-674-99135-4. Online version at the Perseus Digital Library. Greek text available from the same website.
Graves, Robert, The Greek Myths: The Complete and Definitive Edition. Penguin Books Limited. 2017. 

Children of Ares
Demigods in classical mythology
Deucalionids
Aetolian characters in Greek mythology